Amlodipine/celecoxib, sold under the brand name Consensi, is a fixed-dose combination medication used to treat both hypertension and osteoarthritis at the same time in adults. It contains amlodipine, as the besilate, and celecoxib. It is taken by mouth.

The most common side effects include edema, abdominal pain, diarrhea, dyspepsia, flatulence, peripheral edema, accidental injury, dizziness, pharyngitis, rhinitis, sinusitis, upper respiratory tract infection, and rash.

It was approved for medical use in the United States in May 2018.

Medical uses 
Amlodipine/celecoxib is indicated for use in adults for whom treatment with amlodipine for hypertension and celecoxib for osteoarthritis are appropriate.

History 
Amlodipine/celecoxib was approved for use in the United States in May 2018.

References

External links 
 

Combination drugs